= 1972–73 Partick Thistle F.C. season =

Scottish football team season

The 1972–73 season was Partick Thistle's 2nd consecutive season in the top division of Scottish football after being promoted from the Scottish Second Division in 1971.

== Results ==
All results are written with Partick Thistle's score first.

=== Scottish League Division One ===
- 2 September 1972 Dumbarton (h) 4-1
- 9 September 1972 Rangers (a) 1-2
- 16 September 1972 Arbroath (h) 1-2
- 23 September 1972 Airdrieonians (a) 3-1
- 30 September 1972 Falkirk (h) 0-0
- 7 October 1972 Ayr United (a) 1-2
- 14 October 1972 Celtic (h) 0-4
- 21 October 1972 Hibernian (h) 1-3
- 28 October 1972 East Fife (a) 1-0
- 4 November 1972 Aberdeen (h) 0-2
- 11 November 1972 Dundee United (a) 3-0
- 18 November 1972 Motherwell (h) 0-3
- 25 November 1972 Heart of Midlothian (a) 0-2
- 2 December 1972 Kilmarnock (a) 3-2
- 9 December 1972 Morton (h) 1-0
- 16 December 1972 Dundee (a) 1-4
- 23 December 1972 St Johnstone (h) 1-1
- 30 December 1972 Dumbarton (a) 2-4
- 1 January 1973 Rangers (h) 0-1
- 6 January 1973 Arbroath (a) 1-2
- 13 January 1973 Airdrieonians (h) 2-0
- 20 January 1973 Falkirk (a) 3-0
- 27 January 1973 Ayr United (h) 1-2
- 10 February 1973 Celtic (a) 1-1
- 3 March 1973 East Fife (h) 1-1
- 10 March 1973 Aberdeen (a) 0-0
- 13 March 1973 Hibernian (a) 0-2
- 21 March 1973 Dundee United (h) 0-3
- 24 March 1973 Motherwell (a) 0-0
- 31 March 1973 Heart of Midlothian (h) 3-0
- 7 April 1973 Kilmarnock (h) 1-1
- 14 April 1973 Morton (a) 0-5
- 21 April 1973 Dundee (h) 1-1
- 28 April 1973 St Johnstone 3-1

== Scottish Cup ==
- 3 February 1973 r3 St Mirren (a) 1-0
- 24 February 1973 r4 Dumbarton (a) 2-2
- 28 February 1973 r4 replay Dumbarton (h) 3-1
- 17 March 1973 r5 Ayr United (h) 1-5
